Claës J. Rundberg (14 November 1874 – 27 May 1958) was a Swedish sport shooter who competed in the 1908 Summer Olympics, where he won the silver medal in the team free rifle event. He was also a member of the Swedish team which finished fifth in the team military rifle event.

References

External links
profile

1874 births
1958 deaths
Swedish male sport shooters
ISSF rifle shooters
Olympic shooters of Sweden
Shooters at the 1908 Summer Olympics
Olympic silver medalists for Sweden
Olympic medalists in shooting
Medalists at the 1908 Summer Olympics
19th-century Swedish people
20th-century Swedish people